was a Japanese career diplomat. He entered the Foreign Ministry in 1939. In 1952 he was appointed Consul General of Japan in Vancouver, British Columbia and re-opened the consulate after the interruption of World War II. In 1965 he became director general of the North American affairs bureau of the Japanese foreign ministry. After serving as Ambassador to the Philippines,  and deputy foreign minister, he became Ambassador to the United States in 1973 in which position he served until 1976. From 1978 to 1980 he served as Japan's trade negotiator under Prime Minister Masayoshi Ohira.

Born February 16, 1914 in Tokyo, he died June 17, 2000 in Tokyo of liver cancer at the age of 86.

He was the father of career United Nations staff member Yoriko Yasukawa.

References 

1914 births
2000 deaths
Ambassadors of Japan to the United States
Japanese expatriates in Canada